Jamie Thomas Proctor (born 25 March 1992) is an English professional footballer who plays as a striker for  club Port Vale.

He began his career at hometown club Preston North End, turning professional in January 2010 and making his first-team debut four months later. He was loaned out to Stockport County in August 2010 and having featured 34 times for Preston in the 2011–12 season, was signed to Premier League club Swansea City in August 2012. He spent time on loan at Shrewsbury Town before being sold on to Crawley Town in January 2013. He played 49 games in the 2013–14 season, scoring seven goals, and then moved on to Fleetwood Town in June 2014. He spent -seasons with Fleetwood before being sold on to Bradford City following a short loan spell. He spent the 2016–17 League One promotion-winning season with Bolton Wanderers, part of which he spent on loan at Carlisle United, and then was sold to Rotherham United in July 2017. He spent four seasons with Rotherham, without establishing himself in the first-team after rupturing his knee ligaments at the start of the 2017–18 campaign, and instead enjoyed loan spells with Scunthorpe United, AFC Fylde, Newport County and Wigan Athletic. He signed with Port Vale in July 2021 and helped the club to win promotion out of League Two via the play-offs in 2022.

Career

Preston North End
Born in Ingol, Preston, Lancashire, Proctor came through the youth academy at hometown club Preston North End from the age of eight. He scored 15 goals at youth-team level in the 2008–09 season and was part of an under-18 side that knocked Manchester City and Sunderland out of the FA Youth Cup the following year. On 27 January 2010, Proctor was handed a -year professional contract. Manager Darren Ferguson handed Proctor his professional début on the last day of the 2009–10 Championship season, when he came on as a 78th-minute substitute for Chris Brown in a 4–1 defeat to Reading at the Madejski Stadium on 2 May 2010.

On 13 August 2010, Proctor joined League Two club Stockport County on a 28-day loan aged just 17. Having impressed manager Paul Simpson during training, he made his debut the next day, coming on as a 61st-minute substitute for Danny Rowe in a 0–0 draw with Wycombe Wanderers at Edgeley Park. His loan spell was extended for another month until October. On 28 September, Proctor set up a goal for George Donnelly in a 2–2 draw with Accrington Stanley. He made seven appearances for the "Hatters", before returning to Preston after Simpson claimed that Stockport's dire financial situation meant "we've had to let him go for the sake of a couple of hundred quid". Proctor was on the fringes of the "Lilywhites" first-team squad during the 2010–11 season and had to wait until the last game of the season to score his first senior goal in a 3–1 win against Watford at Deepdale, by which stage Preston's relegation into League One had already been confirmed after a disappointing season under the management of Phil Brown.

Proctor was injured with a double hernia in October 2011. Upon his recovery, he struggled to establish himself in the first-team under the management of Graham Westley. He started 26 games and made seven substitute appearances throughout the 2011–12 season, scoring three goals.

Swansea City
On 18 August 2012, Proctor signed a two-year contract with Premier League club Swansea City, who paid Preston an undisclosed fee. He was signed to be a part of the club's new under-21 team rather than a part of Michael Laudrup's first-team plans as chairman Huw Jenkins cited a need to build for the future. He had been identified as a target by previous manager Brendan Rodgers in 2011. His time at the Liberty Stadium was 'frustrating' as he made no appearances in any senior competitions and hated playing youth-team football. On 26 October 2012, Proctor joined League One club Shrewsbury Town on a month long loan, with manager Graham Turner looking for a "good option" up front. He made his "Shrews" debut the next day, playing 90 minutes in a 2–2 draw with Colchester United at the New Meadow. However he made just two further appearances for the club.

Crawley Town
On 16 January 2013, Proctor signed an 18-month deal with League One side Crawley Town after being purchased from Swansea for an undisclosed fee. He scored his first goals for the club with a brace in a 2–0 win at Bury on 2 March. He scored seven goals in 18 games at the Broadfield Stadium during the second half of the 2012–13 season.

Speaking in November 2013, Proctor said he was shocked that the "Red Devils" decided to sack manager Richie Barker following a run of bad results. Six months later, new manager John Gregory said that he wanted more consistency from Proctor. Proctor ended the 2013–14 season with seven goals from 25 starts and 24 substitute appearances. He was offered a new contract at Crawley on a 50% wage reduction, which he rejected.

Fleetwood Town
On 24 June 2014, Proctor joined League One club Fleetwood Town on a two-year deal to start on 1 July. He scored on his debut for the "Cod Army" after coming off the bench in a 2–1 win over Crewe Alexandra at Highbury Stadium on 9 August, earning praise from manager Graham Alexander for his fighting spirit. On 8 November, he was sent off after raising his hands to Cambridge United defender Richard Tait during a 1–0 defeat in the FA Cup first round. He scored eight goals from 33 starts and 11 substitute appearances throughout the 2014–15 campaign. New manager Steven Pressley, appointed in October 2015, looked to focus on pace over power, which led Proctor to struggle for first-team starts.

Bradford City
Proctor joined Bradford City on a one-month loan on 22 January 2016 as part of the transfer deal that saw Devante Cole move to Fleetwood for an undisclosed fee. The loan move was made permanent on 1 February, when Proctor signed a deal with Bradford until the end of the 2015–16 season. He scored on his debut for the "Bantams" in a 1–1 draw with Port Vale on 23 January. He then scored his first goals since signing for the club permanently in a 2–1 win over Doncaster Rovers at Valley Parade on 12 March.  On 20 May, Proctor scored the equalising goal in the play-off semi-final second leg with Millwall; the game ended 1–1 and Bradford lost the tie 4–2 on aggregate.

Bolton Wanderers
On 5 July 2016, Proctor signed a two-year contract with League One club Bolton Wanderers after being signed by manager Phil Parkinson, who had previously took him to Bradford. Proctor again scored on his debut for his new club, scoring in a 4–2 EFL Cup defeat at Blackpool on 9 August. However this was to be his only goal in 29 appearances, 17 of which came from the substitutes' bench, in the first half of the 2016–17 season.

On 31 January 2017, Proctor joined League Two side Carlisle United on loan until the end of the 2016–17 season. Manager Keith Curle described the hectic race to bring Proctor to Brunton Park on deadline day, which saw Carlisle overcome an attempt from Portsmouth to sign the striker. He scored his first goal for the "Blues" on 4 February, and was later sent off for a second yellow card, in a 2–1 win at Leyton Orient. On 6 May, he scored the winning goal in a 3–2 victory at Exeter City that secured Keith Curle's "Cumbrians" a place in the play-offs. Carlisle went on to play Exeter in the play-off semi-finals, and were beaten 6–5 on aggregate.

Rotherham United
On 3 July 2017, Proctor was sold to Rotherham United for an undisclosed fee (later revealed to be £75,000), signing a two-year contract with the League One club. He scored his first competitive goal for the "Millers" in an EFL Cup first round victory against Lincoln City on 8 August. On 26 August, Proctor picked up a serious injury after colliding with Charlton Athletic's Chris Solly, with tests later revealing he had suffered tears to the anterior cruciate ligament, medial collateral ligament and his meniscus. Rotherham went on to win promotion at the end of the 2017–18 season as Proctor recovered from his injury and the subsequent knee surgeries. He returned to action in an EFL Cup tie against Wigan Athletic on 14 August 2018, scoring a brace in a 3–1 win at the New York Stadium. On 24 November, he came off the bench to score a last minute equaliser against local rivals Sheffield United in a 2–2 draw. He was restricted to just two Championship starts in the 2018–19 relegation season, though he made a further 14 appearances from the bench.

On 30 August 2019, Proctor joined League Two club Scunthorpe United on loan until the end of the 2019–20 season. Rotherham had an abundance of strikers as they had already signed Freddie Ladapo and Carlton Morris earlier in the transfer window. However he made just four starts in 13 league appearances for Paul Hurst's "Iron", scoring one goal. On 20 January 2020, Proctor joined National League club AFC Fylde on loan until the end of the season after finishing his loan at Scunthorpe United early. Upon bringing Proctor to Mill Farm, "Coasters" manager Jim Bentley boasted that "“I've got a history within my managerial career of re-launching careers of players who might’ve lost their way for whatever reason such as lack of form or injury". Proctor would score one goal in nine games for Fylde.

Speaking in September 2020, Proctor said he had suffered "the worst three years you could imagine for a player" and admitted that "when I have played I haven't been good enough" but hoped to regain the trust of manager Paul Warne after fully recovering from his knee injury. On 16 October 2020, Proctor joined Newport County on loan until 17 January. He scored his first goal for the "Exiles" on 28 November, in a 3–0 FA Cup second round win against Salford City at Rodney Parade. He scored two goals in 13 games for Michael Flynn's Newport, of which only five appearances were league starts. On 1 February 2021, Proctor joined League One side Wigan Athletic on loan until the end of the 2020–21 season. Five days later, he scored on his debut for the "Latics" in a 3–2 defeat to AFC Wimbledon at the DW Stadium. Manager Leam Richardson said he was very impressed with Proctor's performance. He scored two goals for Wigan in seven starts and eight substitute appearances. On 17 May 2021, Rotherham United published their retained list, and confirmed Proctor would be leaving the club at the end of his contract.

Port Vale

On 5 July 2021, Proctor signed a one-year contract with League Two side Port Vale. He enjoyed a strong start to the 2021–22 season, scoring five goals in his first seven games, including braces at Forest Green Rovers and at home to Rochdale. He added two further goals to his tally before being sidelined with a hernia problem that required surgery in mid-October. He returned to action with a substitute appearance at the end of November, but aggravated the stomach injury when he collided with the opposition goalkeeper and had to undergo another operation on a thigh and pelvic tendon. He returned to action in mid-February and formed a strong partnership with James Wilson; former "Valiant" striker Tom Pope praised both players for their intelligence. On 26 March, he scored a scissor-kick volley in a 2–0 win over Sutton United at Vale Park that was reminiscent of Paolo Di Canio's memorable strike for West Ham United 22 years earlier. This later won him the club's Goal of the Season award. He played as a substitute in the play-off final at Wembley Stadium as Vale secured promotion with a 3–0 victory over Mansfield Town. He signed a new contract in June 2022, having finished as club's top-scorer with 15 goals.

Proctor struggled with a hip injury during his five appearances at the start of the 2022–23 season and manager Darrell Clarke confirmed in September that he had been ruled out of action for a few months after undergoing an operation. He returned to the pitch at the end of January and scored his first goal in ten months on 11 February.

Style of play
Proctor is a  target man striker who is able to hold the ball up and bring other players into the game. He is hard working and has said: "you’ll get 100% from me, some days there will be good performances and some days might be less so but what you will get is hard work and giving it my all".

Personal life
Proctor has degrees in sports journalism and business and set up a Preston-based coaching academy in 2020; he described the coaching there as "professional, private and more technical". He has attended courses at the Open University, Staffordshire University and the University of Sunderland. He had a baby daughter in 2018. In November 2019, he made a plea in the Rotherham Advertiser for charities to contact him with voluntary work opportunities after he watched a documentary on food banks.

Career statistics

Honours
Bolton Wanderers
EFL League One second-place promotion: 2016–17

Rotherham United
EFL League One second-place promotion: 2019–20

Port Vale
EFL League Two play-offs: 2022

References

Extermal links
JP Pro Coaching Proctor's football academy website

1992 births
Living people
Footballers from Preston, Lancashire
English footballers
Association football forwards
Preston North End F.C. players
Stockport County F.C. players
Swansea City A.F.C. players
Shrewsbury Town F.C. players
Crawley Town F.C. players
Fleetwood Town F.C. players
Bradford City A.F.C. players
Bolton Wanderers F.C. players
Carlisle United F.C. players
Rotherham United F.C. players
Scunthorpe United F.C. players
AFC Fylde players
Newport County A.F.C. players
Wigan Athletic F.C. players
Port Vale F.C. players
English Football League players
National League (English football) players
Alumni of the Open University
Alumni of Staffordshire University
Alumni of the University of Sunderland